David Green (born January 28, 1958) is an American former stock car racing driver, who currently works as a NASCAR official. While driving, he won the 1994 NASCAR Busch Series championship. His two younger brothers, Jeff and Mark have also competed in the NASCAR circuit. As of 2022 he remains 1 of 2 NASCAR Xfinity Series Champions to not to score a single top ten in the NASCAR Cup Series.

Early Busch career
Green, born in Owensboro, Kentucky,  made his debut in 1989 at Hickory Motor Speedway for Day Enterprise Racing, starting 15th but finishing 30th after suffering an engine failure. He ran two more races the next year, suffering transmission failure in both races. In 1991, Green signed up with FILMAR Racing to drive the No. 8, and made an immediate impact, winning the pole position at the season-opening Goody's 300. Despite failing to qualify for two of the first seven races, Green won in just his 12th start at Lanier Raceway. He would finish runner-up to Jeff Gordon for Rookie of the Year. Surprisingly, Green was fired from the ride, and spent the 1992 season working as a member of Bobby Labonte's pit crew. When Labonte moved to Winston Cup in 1993, Green took over the team's No. 44 ride. Although he did not win, he finished in the top ten 16 times and finished third in the points. The next year, he won the Goody's 250, nine poles, as well as the Busch Series championship. Green stayed with Labonte Racing and won four more poles in 1995, but dropped to twelfth in points.

Winston Cup
After the 1995 season, Green was offered a contract from Buzz McCall, owner of the new American Equipment Racing team. Running the No. 95, Green returned to his former dominance, winning twice and finishing runner-up to Randy LaJoie in the championship chase. At the end of the season, McCall and Green elevated their operation to Winston Cup, this time as the No. 96 driver. Unfortunately, they were not able to duplicate their success, as Green failed to qualify for six races, and could only manage a best finish of 16th at the Coca-Cola 600. Despite this, he still finished runner-up to Mike Skinner for Rookie of the Year. Meanwhile, Green also served as a fill-in driver for Dale Earnhardt at Watkins Glen International in the event Earnhardt could not continue running after suffering injuries in a crash at Talladega Superspeedway. However, Earnhardt ran the full distance, and Green did not need to step in. After he could not manage a higher finish than 17th at Talladega Superspeedway in 1998, Green was fired from the 96 ride. Green returned to the Busch Series to drive the No. 36 Pontiac Grand Prix for Team 34. He drove for the rest of the year, and finished in the top-five in his first six races for the team. Late in the season, he received a call from Larry Hedrick Motorsports, who had been struggling following the release of Steve Grissom from their No. 41 Chevy. Green would run four races for Hedrick for the rest of the year, and signed to drive for them in 1999. In addition, he would run the No. 41 car in the Busch Series for Hedrick on a limited schedule. Still, Green continued to struggle, but had the lowest DNQ count (2) in his career.

As the season began to close, Green signed on for the rest of the season with Tyler Jet Motorsports, and enjoyed the best performance of his career, finishing a career-best 12th at Phoenix International Raceway, then won the pole the next race at the inaugural Pennzoil 400. Green did well in the Busch Series, running seventeen races and having seven top-tens and a pole position. He ran the Bud Shootout in 2000 in a car owned by Jackie Joyner-Kersee, and hoped to run the Daytona 500, but sponsorship problems forced that deal to fall through. Green would fill in for an injured Bill Elliott for two races later on that season, with a best finish of twenty-fifth.

Current run
In 2000, Green returned to Team 34. That year, he had eleven top-ten finishes, and then six more the following year. At the end of that season, Green was left without a permanent ride. After a few part-time rides, Green finished out the season with Hendrick Motorsports, replacing Ricky Hendrick in the No. 5. That performance gave Green a brief return to Cup, running two races in Hendrick's R&D car. During the season, he also worked in Winston Cup as a spotter for Dale Jarrett.

In 2003, Green signed with Brewco Motorsports, and returned to his winning form, as he visited victory lane three times (his win at Kansas that year would be Pontiac's last win in the top two divisions of NASCAR), and finishing second in points. He would not win in 2004, but he did run another Cup race at Richmond for Brewco, finishing 31st. In 2005, Green won at Pikes Peak and had an eighth-place finish in points. After failing to finish in the top-five during the 2006, Green was released from Brewco in the closing part of the season. He drove for Riley D'Hondt Motorsports in a part-time schedule in 2007, making three starts with a best finish of eleventh. He also drove seven races in the 2007 season for Red Horse Racing in the Craftsman Truck Series, finishing fifth at Kentucky Speedway. He spent 2008 as a test driver for JR Motorsports, and ran the final race of the season in the No. 0 JD Motorsports Chevy. He signed up to drive the new No. 07 SK Motorsports team in 2009 full-time, but was released after several races. Green made one start in 2010 driving the No. 49 Chevy at Phoenix. In 2011, Green became the spotter for Bobby Labonte. He is also the spotter for Johanna Long in the Nationwide Series. Green now works for NASCAR as an official.

Motorsports career results

NASCAR
(key) (Bold – Pole position awarded by qualifying time. Italics – Pole position earned by points standings or practice time. * – Most laps led.)

Nextel Cup Series

Daytona 500

Nationwide Series

Craftsman Truck Series

ARCA SuperCar Series
(key) (Bold – Pole position awarded by qualifying time. Italics – Pole position earned by points standings or practice time. * – Most laps led.)

References

External links
 

Living people
1958 births
Sportspeople from Owensboro, Kentucky
Racing drivers from Owensboro, Kentucky
Racing drivers from Kentucky
NASCAR drivers
NASCAR Xfinity Series champions
American Speed Association drivers
Caterpillar Inc. people
ARCA Menards Series drivers
Hendrick Motorsports drivers
Dale Earnhardt Inc. drivers